Jean-Baptiste Armand Louis Léonce Élie de Beaumont (25 September 1798 – 21 September 1874) was a  French geologist.

Biography
Élie de Beaumont was born at Canon, in Calvados. He was educated at the Lycee Henri IV where he took the first prize in mathematics and physics at the École polytechnique, where he stood first at the exit examination in 1819; and at the École des mines (1819–1822), where he began to show a decided preference for the science with which his name is associated. In 1823 he was selected along with Dufrénoy by Brochant de Villiers, the professor of geology in the École des Mines, to accompany him on a scientific tour to England and Scotland, in order to inspect the mining and metallurgical establishments of the country, and to study the principles on which George Bellas Greenough's geological map of England (1820) had been prepared, with a view to the construction of a similar map of France.

In 1835 he was appointed professor of geology at the École des Mines, in succession to Brochant de Villiers, whose assistant he had been in the duties of the chair since 1827. He held the office of engineer-in-chief of mines in France from 1833 until 1847, when he was appointed inspector-general; and in 1861 he became vice-president of the Conseil-General des Mines and a grand officer of the Legion of Honour. His growing scientific reputation secured his election to the membership of the Academy of Berlin, of the French Academy of Sciences, of the Royal Society of Edinburgh (1845), of the Royal Society of London, as a foreign member of the Royal Swedish Academy of Sciences (1848), and as an international member of the American Philosophical Society (1860). By a decree of the president he was made a senator of France in 1852, and on the death of François Arago in 1853 he was chosen perpetual secretary of the Academy of Sciences.

Élie de Beaumont's name is widely known to geologists in connection with his theory of the origin of mountain ranges, first propounded in a paper read to the Academy of Sciences in 1829, and afterwards elaborated in his Notice sur le systeme des montagnes (3 volumes, 1852). According to his view, all mountain ranges parallel to the same great circle of the earth are of strictly contemporaneous origin, and between the great circles a relation of symmetry exists in the form of a pentagonal réseau. An elaborate statement and criticism of the theory was given in his anniversary address to the Geological Society of London in 1853 by William Hopkins. The theory did not find general acceptance, but it proved of great value to geological science, owing to the extensive additions to the knowledge of the structure of mountain ranges which its author made in endeavouring to find facts to support it.

Mount Elie de Beaumont is in the Westland Tai Poutini National Park, on the west coast of New Zealand's the South Island and near the boundary with Aoraki / Mount Cook National Park. It is 3109m high.

Probably, however, the best service Élie de Beaumont rendered to science was in connection with the geological map of France, in the preparation of which he had the leading share. During this period Élie de Beaumont published many important memoirs on the geology of the country. After his superannuation at the École des Mines he continued to superintend the issue of the detailed maps almost until his death, which occurred at Canon. His academic lectures for 1843-1844 were published in 2 volumes, (1845–1849), under the title Leçons de Géologie pratique.

References

Catholic Encyclopedia article

1798 births
1874 deaths
People from Mézidon Vallée d'Auge
French geologists
French mining engineers
Tectonicists
Corps des mines
Lycée Henri-IV alumni
École Polytechnique alumni
Mines Paris - PSL alumni
Members of the French Academy of Sciences
Members of the Prussian Academy of Sciences
Members of the Royal Swedish Academy of Sciences
Fellows of the Royal Society of Edinburgh
Foreign Members of the Royal Society
Wollaston Medal winners
Foreign associates of the National Academy of Sciences